The 2010 World Short Track Speed Skating Championships took place between 19 and 21 March 2010 in Sofia, Bulgaria. The World Championships are organised by the ISU which also run world cups and championships in speed skating and figure skating.

Results

Men

* First place is awarded 34 points, second is awarded 21 points, third is awarded 13 points, fourth is awarded 8 points, fifth is awarded 5 points, sixth is awarded 3 points, seventh is awarded 2 points, and eighth is awarded 1 point in the finals of each individual race to determine the overall world champion. The leader after the first 1000m in the 3000m Super-Final is awarded extra 5 points. The relays do not count for the overall classification.

Women

* First place is awarded 34 points, second is awarded 21 points, third is awarded 13 points, fourth is awarded 8 points, fifth is awarded 5 points, sixth is awarded 3 points, seventh is awarded 2 points, and eighth is awarded 1 point in the finals of each individual race to determine the overall world champion. The leader after the first 1000m in the 3000m Super-Final is awarded extra 5 points. The relays do not count for the overall classification.

Medal table

External links
 ISU Results
 ISU World Short Track Speed Skating Championships 2010 Sofia
 Results book

World Short Track Speed Skating Championships
World Short Track Championships
International speed skating competitions hosted by Bulgaria
World Short Track Speed Skating Championships
World Short Track
Sports competitions in Sofia
2010s in Sofia